Eslamabad-e Tang Shib (also Romanized as Eslāmābād-e Tang Shīb) is a village in Kuhmareh Rural District, Kuhmareh District, Kazerun County, Fars Province, Iran. At the 2006 census, its population was 110, in 28 families.

References 

Populated places in Kazerun County